Nebria carri is a species of ground beetle from Nebriinae subfamily that is endemic to the US state of Idaho.

References

carri
Beetles described in 1979
Beetles of North America
Endemic fauna of the United States